Cameraria conglomeratella is a moth of the family Gracillariidae. It is known from Illinois, Kentucky, Texas, California, Florida, Georgia, Maryland, New Jersey, Ohio and Virginia in the United States.

The wingspan is 7.5–9 mm.

The larvae feed on Quercus species, including Quercus bicolor, Quercus chrysolepis, Quercus obtusifolia, Quercus obtusiloba and Quercus virginiana. They mine the leaves of their host plant. The mine has the form of a tentiform mine on the upperside of the leaf. The pupa is formed under a flat, nearly circular silken cocoon.

References

External links
mothphotographersgroup
Bug Guide
Cameraria at microleps.org

Cameraria (moth)
Moths described in 1875

Moths of North America
Lepidoptera of the United States
Leaf miners
Taxa named by Philipp Christoph Zeller